Qarwa K'anti (Quechua qarwa pale, yellowish, golden, k'anti a kind of distaff, "yellowish distaff", Hispanicized spelling Jarhuacante) is a mountain in the Chunta mountain range in the Andes of Peru, about  high. It lies in the Huancavelica Region, Castrovirreyna Province, on the border of the districts of Castrovirreyna and Santa Ana, and in the Huancavelica Province, Huancavelica District. Qarwa K'anti lies south of Wachu Intiyuq, southwest of Antarasu and north of Yawar Q'asa.

References

Mountains of Huancavelica Region
Mountains of Peru